Jonatan Johansson (7 March 1980, Sollentuna, Stockholm County – 12 March 2006, Lake Placid, New York) was a Swedish Olympic snowboarder.

Johansson died following a failed jump landing during training for the International Ski Federation World Cup competition.

In 2000 he began competing at the World Cup level and was ranked 45th in the world. In 2005, he was the Swedish champion and won first prize in the Finnish National Championship. He was twelfth in the final rankings for Snowboard Cross at the 2006 Winter Olympics in Turin, Italy.

He died in a snowboarding accident at Whiteface Mountain in Lake Placid, New York, five days after his 26th birthday. It was the last run he had planned for the day. The snow had become faster and previous snowboarders had jumped very far. Allegedly, Johansson lost his balance before jumping; however, he did not abort the jump. In midair, he lost his balance and fell, breaking his femur and ribs. His ripped aorta and punctured lung and heart proved fatal.

References

External links
FIS Profile

1980 births
2006 deaths
People from Sollentuna Municipality
Swedish male snowboarders
Skiing deaths
Olympic snowboarders of Sweden
Snowboarders at the 2006 Winter Olympics
Sports deaths in New York (state)
Sportspeople from Stockholm County